Egor Alekseyevich Gerasimov (born 11 November 1992 in Minsk) is a Belarusian professional tennis player. He has a career high ATP singles ranking of World No. 65, which he achieved on 24 February 2020. He also achieved a career high ATP doubles ranking of World No. 263 on 2 March 2015.

Professional career

2014: ATP debut
In 2014, Gerasimov made his ATP main draw debut in Shenzhen, where he received entry to the main draw as a wildcard entrant.

2015-2018: ATP Challenger success and consolidation

In July 2018, Gerasimov recorded his first ATP match victory on the hard courts of Los Cabos, defeating Bernard Tomic 6-4 6-3. He also beat the experienced big server Sam Querrey before facing defeat against world number 4 Juan Martín del Potro.

2019-2020: Grand Slam debut and first win, Maiden ATP final
At the 2019 US Open, Gerasimov won his first Grand Slam match, defeating Lloyd Harris 7-5 7-6 7-6, having progressed through the qualifying rounds. Gerasimov's form continued onto the indoor courts of St Petersburg, where he advanced through qualifying to his first ever ATP Semi-Final. He finally lost a close match to world number 4 and home favourite Daniil Medvedev 5-7 5-7. This result catapulted Gerasimov into the top 100 for the first time.

He reached his maiden ATP final at the 2020 Maharashtra Open where he was defeated by Jiří Veselý.

2021

Gerasimov made a strong start to the year, reaching the Semi-Finals on the indoor courts of Montpellier. He defeated former world number one Andy Murray 7-6 6-1 in the first round before finally being defeated by David Goffin 4-6 6-2 4-6.

Singles performance timelines

Current through the 2022 Miami Open.
{|class=wikitable style=text-align:center
!Tournament!!2013!!2014!!2015!!2016!!2017!!2018!!2019!!2020!!2021
!2022!!SR!!W–L!!Win%
|-
| colspan="14" style="text-align:left" |Grand Slam tournaments
|-
|bgcolor=efefef align=left|Australian Open
|A
|Q1
|A
|Q2
|A
|A
|Q1
|bgcolor=afeeee|2R
|bgcolor=afeeee|2R
|bgcolor=afeeee|1R
|bgcolor=efefef|0 / 3
|bgcolor=efefef|2–3
|bgcolor=efefef|
|-
|bgcolor=efefef align=left|French Open
|A
|A
|A
|Q1
|A
|Q1
|Q1
|bgcolor=afeeee|1R
|bgcolor=afeeee|1R
|
|bgcolor=efefef|0 / 2
|bgcolor=efefef|0–2
|bgcolor=efefef|
|-
|bgcolor=efefef align=left|Wimbledon
|A
|A
|A
|A
|Q1
|Q1
|Q1
|style=color:#767676|NH
|bgcolor=afeeee|2R
|
|bgcolor=efefef|0 / 1
|bgcolor=efefef|1–1
|bgcolor=efefef|
|-
|bgcolor=efefef align=left|US Open
|A
|Q1
|A
|Q1
|Q2
|Q2
|bgcolor=afeeee|2R
|bgcolor=afeeee|2R
|bgcolor=afeeee|1R
|
|bgcolor=efefef|0 / 3
|bgcolor=efefef|2–3
|bgcolor=efefef|
|- style=font-weight:bold;background:#efefef
| style="text-align:left" |Win–loss
|0–0
|0–0
|0–0
|0–0
|0–0
|0–0
|1–1
|2–3
|2–4
|0–1
|0 / 9
|5–9
|
|-
| colspan="14" align="left" |ATP Masters 1000
|-
|bgcolor=efefef align=left|Indian Wells Masters
|A
|A
|A
|A
|A
|A
|Q2
|style=color:#767676|NH
|bgcolor=afeeee|1R
|Q1
|bgcolor=efefef|0 / 1
|bgcolor=efefef|0–1
|bgcolor=efefef|
|-
|bgcolor=efefef align=left|Miami Masters
|A
|A
|A
|A
|A
|A
|Q1
|style=color:#767676|NH
|A
|Q1
|bgcolor=efefef|0 / 0
|bgcolor=efefef|0–0
|bgcolor=efefef|
|-
|bgcolor=efefef align=left|Monte Carlo Masters
|A
|A
|A
|A
|A
|A
|A
|style=color:#767676|NH
|Q1
|
|bgcolor=efefef|0 / 0
|bgcolor=efefef|0–0
|bgcolor=efefef|
|-
|bgcolor=efefef align=left|Madrid Masters
|A
|A
|A
|A
|A
|A
|A
|style=color:#767676|NH
|Q1
|
|bgcolor=efefef|0 / 0
|bgcolor=efefef|0–0
|bgcolor=efefef|
|-
|bgcolor=efefef align=left|Italian Open
|A
|A
|A
|A
|A
|A
|A
|Q1
|Q1
|
|bgcolor=efefef|0 / 0
|bgcolor=efefef|0–0
|bgcolor=efefef|
|-
|bgcolor=efefef align=left|Canada Masters
|A
|A
|A
|A
|A
|A
|A
|style=color:#767676|NH
|A
|
|bgcolor=efefef|0 / 0
|bgcolor=efefef|0–0
|bgcolor=efefef|
|-
|bgcolor=efefef align=left|Cincinnati Masters
|A
|A
|A
|A
|A
|A
|A
|Q1
|Q1
|
|bgcolor=efefef|0 / 0
|bgcolor=efefef|0–0
|bgcolor=efefef|
|-
|bgcolor=efefef align=left|Shanghai Masters
|A
|A
|A
|A
|A
|A
|A
| colspan="2" style="color:#767676" |NH
|
|bgcolor=efefef|0 / 0
|bgcolor=efefef|0–0
|bgcolor=efefef|
|-
|bgcolor=efefef align=left|Paris Masters
|A
|A
|A
|A
|A
|A
|Q2
|A
|Q1
|
|bgcolor=efefef|0 / 0
|bgcolor=efefef|0–0
|bgcolor=efefef|
|- style=font-weight:bold;background:#efefef
| style="text-align:left" |Win–loss
|0–0
|0–0
|0–0
|0–0
|0–0
|0–0
|0–0
|0–0
|0–1
|0–0
|0 / 1
|0–1
|
|-
| colspan="14" style="text-align:left" |Career statistics
|- style=font-weight:bold;background:#efefef
|Tournament||2013||2014||2015||2016||2017||2018||2019||2020||2021
|2022||SR||W–L||Win%
|-style=background:#efefef
|align=left|Tournaments
|0
|1
|0
|0
|0
|2
|7
|9
|24
|6
| colspan="3" |50
|-style=font-weight:bold;background:#efefef
|style=text-align:left|Titles
|0
|0
|0
|0
|0
|0
|0
|0
|0
|0
|colspan=3|0
|- style=font-weight:bold;background:#efefef
|style=text-align:left|Finals
|0
|0
|0
|0
|0
|0
|0
|1
|0
|0
|colspan=3|1
|- style=font-weight:bold;background:#efefef
|style=text-align:left|Overall win–loss
|1–1
|2–2
|5–1
|3–0
|3–0
|5–5
|10–7
|13–10
|16–24
|2–6
|0 / 50
|60–56
|
|- style=background:#efefef
|style=text-align:left|Win%
|50%
|50%
|83%
|100%
|100%
|50%
|59%
|57%
|
|
| colspan="3" |
|- style=background:#efefef
|align=left|Year-end ranking
|253
|268
|188
|297
|149
|157
|98
|78
|113
|
|colspan=3|$1,634,699 
|}

ATP career finals
Singles: 1 (1 runner-up)

 Challenger and ITF finals 
 Singles (9–10) 

 Doubles (7–5) 

Record against other players
Record against top 10 players
Gerasimov's match record against those who have been ranked in the top 10, with those who have been No. 1 in bold (ATP World Tour, Grand Slam and Davis Cup main draw matches).

  Matteo Berrettini 1–0
  David Goffin 1–1
  John Isner 1–0
  Andy Murray 1–0  Gilles Simon 1–0
  Jo-Wilfried Tsonga 1–0
  Juan Martín del Potro 0–1
  Fabio Fognini 0–1
  Richard Gasquet 0–1
  Daniil Medvedev 0–1
  Rafael Nadal 0–1'  Andrey Rublev 0–1
  Diego Schwartzman 0–1
  Denis Shapovalov 0–1
  Fernando Verdasco 0–1
  Alexander Zverev 0–1
  Stefanos Tsitsipas 0–2* Wins over top 10 players
Gerasimov has a  record against players who were, at the time the match was played, ranked in the top 10.* ''

References

External links
 
 
 

1992 births
Living people
Belarusian male tennis players
Tennis players from Minsk
Olympic tennis players of Belarus
Tennis players at the 2020 Summer Olympics
21st-century Belarusian people